Anthony "Tony" Myler (born 1 October 1960) is an English former professional rugby league footballer who played in the 1980s and 1990s who also became a coach. A Great Britain international representative , he played club football in England for Widnes, with whom he won the Premiership during the 1982–83 season, as well as a stint in Australia with the Balmain Tigers. Tony Myler is the brother of the rugby league footballer John Myler and the uncle of Stephen Myler

Playing
Myler played for Widnes RUFC Colts before embarking on a professional career with the Widnes rugby league club in 1978.

Tony Myler played as an interchange/substitute, i.e. number 14, (replacing  Mick Burke on 59-minutes) in Widnes 14-14 draw with Hull F.C. in the 1982 Challenge Cup Final during the 1981–82 season at Wembley Stadium, London on Saturday 1 May 1982, in front of a crowd of 92,147, was an unused Interchange/Substitute, i.e. number 14, in the 9-18 defeat by Hull F.C. in the 1982 Challenge Cup Final replay during the 1981–82 season at Elland Road, Leeds on Wednesday 19 May 1982, in front of a crowd of 41,171,

Australia played a match against Widnes during the 1982 Kangaroo tour of Great Britain and France and Myler played at loose forward. In 1983 he was awarded the Harry Sunderland Trophy for man-of-the-match in that year's Premiership Final .

During the 1983–84 season Myler played stand-off half in Widnes' loss against Barrow in the 1983 Lancashire County Cup Final at Central Park, Wigan on Saturday 1 October 1983.

In 1986 Myler agreed to join Australian club, the Balmain Tigers during the English off-season as his Great Britain test teammate Garry Schofield had done. During the 1986 Kangaroo tour of Great Britain and France, Myler played for Great Britain at stand-off half in all three Ashes tests.

During the 1989–90 Rugby Football League season, he played for defending champions Widnes at stand-off half in their 1989 World Club Challenge victory against the visiting Canberra Raiders. Myler's Testimonial match at Widnes also took place in 1989.

During the 1990–91 season Myler captained Widnes at stand-off half and scored a try in the 24-18 victory over Salford in the 1990 Lancashire County CupFinal at Central Park, Wigan on Saturday 29 September 1990.

Coaching
Following his retirement from playing, Myler became coach of Widnes in May 1994. In August 1995 the club decided to bring back Doug Laughton for a third stint as team manager which resulted in Myler's sacking as coach.

Myler was also on the coaching staff at St. Helens and Warrington Wolves in the early years of Super League.

References

External links
Tony Myler at yesterdayshero.com
Tony Myler at rugbyleagueproject.org

1960 births
Living people
Balmain Tigers players
English rugby league coaches
English rugby league players
Great Britain national rugby league team players
Lancashire rugby league team players
Rugby league five-eighths
Rugby league players from Widnes
St Helens R.F.C. coaches
Warrington Wolves coaches
Widnes Vikings captains
Widnes Vikings coaches
Widnes Vikings players